Collaboraction Theatre Company is a social justice theatre company in Chicago.

History
Founded in 1996 by Kimberly Senior, Sandra Delgado, John Cabrera, and others, Collaboraction has been led by Artistic Director Anthony Moseley since 1999. Collaboraction uses performance for dialogue on social issues. Collaboraction is the resident theatre company of Kennedy-King College in the Englewood neighborhood on the south side of Chicago.

Awards

 Foster Innovation Award from the City of Chicago's Department of Cultural Affairs and Special Events - 2020
 Multi-Racial Unity Award from the Racial Justice Taskforce of the First Unitarian Church of Chicago - 2020
 Otto Award from the Castillo Theatre - 2018
 Stand for the Arts Award from Comcast and Ovation TV - 2018

Productions

 The annual Sketchbook Festival
 The annual Peacebook Festival

Collaboraction created a mental health PSA campaign during the COVID-19 pandemic to aid theatre workers. The campaign was a collaborative effort between Collaboraction, NAMI Chicago, Season of Concern, and the League of Chicago Theatres.

References 

Social justice organizations
Theatre companies in Chicago
Non-profit organizations based in Chicago
Performing groups established in 1996